The 1972 California Golden Bears football team was an American football team that represented the University of California, Berkeley in the Pacific-8 Conference (Pac-8) during the 1972 NCAA University Division football season. In their first year under head coach Mike White, the Golden Bears compiled a 3–8 record (3–4 against Pac-8 opponents), finished in fifth place in the Pac-8, and were outscored by their opponents by a combined total of 314 to 228.

The team's statistical leaders included Steve Bartkowski with 944 passing yards, Steve Kemnitzer with 434 rushing yards, and Steve Sweeney with 785 receiving yards.

Schedule

Roster

Season summary

Stanford

75th meeting between the schools
Steve Sweeney set single season conference record for receiving touchdowns, tied the single season school record and set the school career record for receptions.

References

California
California Golden Bears football seasons
California Golden Bears football